Nils Åman (born 7 February 2000) is a Swedish professional ice hockey centre for the  Vancouver Canucks of the National Hockey League (NHL). He was drafted by the Colorado Avalanche in the sixth round of the 2020 NHL Entry Draft with the 167th overall pick.

Playing career
Åman originally played as a youth with hometown club, Avesta HK, before joining Leksands IF junior ranks on 29 March 2016. During his third season within Leksands, Åman was promoted from the J20 SuperElit and made his professional debut in the HockeyAllsvenskan, appearing in three games of the 2018–19 season. He made four further appearances in qualification, helping Leksands gain promotion to the Swedish Hockey League (SHL).

Åman continued his development in the following 2019–20 season, accounting for 47 points in 30 matches in J20. During the season he was loaned out to Karlskrona HK of the HockeyAllsvenskan where he played six games. He later returned to Leksands and made eight appearances in the SHL with Leksands posting one goal and two assists for three points. He was promptly signed to a two-year men's team contract with Leksands on 19 March 2020.

Showing an offensive touch with a strong two-way game, Åman was selected in the sixth round, 167th overall, of the 2020 NHL Entry Draft by the Colorado Avalanche. In the following 2020–21 season, his first full year in the SHL, Åman made 51 appearances with Leskands as a depth forward, posting two goals and eight assists for 10 points. He recorded his first playoff goal in a first-round loss to Örebro HK.

During the 2021–22 season, having increased his ice time and scoring totals, Åman was signed to a three-year contract extension to remain with Leksands until 2025 on 23 December 2021. He completed the campaign having notched six goals and 8 assists for 14 points in 51 appearances.

With the Colorado Avalanche opting not to sign Åman before his drafts rights expired on 1 June 2022, he was soon signed as a free agent to a two-year, entry-level contract with the Vancouver Canucks on 8 June 2022. After a successful training camp, Åman was announced to have made the Canucks 2022–23 season's opening night roster.

International play
Åman joined the Swedish national team, following completion of the 2021–22 season, and following five friendly games was later selected to the preliminary squad to compete at the 2022 IIHF World Championship in Finland on 11 May 2022.

Career statistics

Regular season and playoffs

International

References

External links
 

2000 births
Living people
Abbotsford Canucks players
Colorado Avalanche draft picks
Leksands IF players
Karlskrona HK players
People from Avesta Municipality
Sportspeople from Dalarna County
Swedish ice hockey centres
Vancouver Canucks players